The Women's 470 class at the 2011 ISAF Sailing World Championships was held in Perth, Western Australia between 12 and 18 December 2011.

Results

References

External links

Women's 470
Women's 470 World Championships
ISAF
2011 in Australian women's sport